Daniel Ferguson is a filmmaker.

Daniel Ferguson may also refer to:

Daniel C. Ferguson (born 1927), American businessman
Daniel Ferguson (voice actor) (born 1993), American voice actor
Danny Ferguson (1903–1971), Welsh footballer
Danny Ferguson (Scottish footballer) (1939–1977), Scottish footballer